Staci-Lyn Honda is former general assignment reporter for WSYR-TV, ABC affiliate, in Syracuse, New York.  Honda also previously served in the same capacity at WETM-TV in Elmira, New York where she started her career as an anchor and reporter. At WETM Honda also served as the weekend  news anchor.

Personal 
Honda was born and raised in Colorado and has family in Hawaii. She graduated magna cum laude from Penn State University in May 2006 with a degree in broadcast journalism and a second degree in politics. Honda enjoys spending her free time with her family and her dog Harley.

Career
Honda has worked as a reporter for both WEIU-TV and WTAJ, and as an intern at NBC on Capitol Hill. Honda is currently working as a reporter for WSYR-TV in Syracuse, NY. She began working here in August 2010 as a weekend reporter and eventually worked her way up to becoming the 6 pm and 11 pm anchor.

On April 11, 2015, it was reported that anchor Jennifer Sanders would be replacing Honda during the "Morning News" broadcast.  Honda's information has been removed from the News Channel 9 website and her associated Twitter account has been deleted.

References 

Living people
Year of birth missing (living people)